Bashkim Pitarka is an Albanian former diplomat. He served as Permanent Representative of Albania to the United Nations from 1986 to 1991.

Biography
Pitarka was a member of the Albanian Labor Party.

Pitarka served as Permanent Representative of Albania to the United Nations from 1986 to 1991. In October 1989 he called for the dispersal of the NATO and the Warsaw Treaty military alliances.

In September 1990, after a series of talks with the United States to establish diplomatic relations after a break of 51 years, Pitarka said: "We have crossed our fingers. We are ready and we are waiting for a reply. We are waiting for the last O.K. from the President of the United States. We are ready to begin tomorrow."

References 

Albania–United States relations
Permanent Representatives of Albania to the United Nations
Labour Party of Albania politicians
Year of birth missing (living people)
Living people